Khurgan (also Romanized as Khūrgān; also known as Khargūn) is a village in Tasuj Rural District, in the Central District of Kavar County, Fars Province, Iran. As of the 2006 census, its population was 159, distributed among 31 families.

References 

Populated places in Kavar County